Hilde-Katrine Engeli (born 4 August 1988) is a snowboarder from Norway.

Career 
She won a gold medal at the 2011 FIS Snowboarding World Championships in the parallel slalom event.

References

External links
 FIS-Ski.com – Biography

Norwegian female snowboarders
1988 births
Living people
Snowboarders at the 2014 Winter Olympics
Olympic snowboarders of Norway
21st-century Norwegian women